DRQ may refer to:

 DMA request, a hardware event related to direct memory access functionality
 Dril-Quip, Inc., a company listed on the New York Stock Exchange as DRQ
 WDRQ, Detroit radio station marketed as "The new DRQ"
 DRQ, the main character in the critically acclaimed videogame GODS